Arachnocampa is a genus of nine fungus gnat species which have a bioluminescent larval stage, akin to the larval stage of glowworm beetles.  The species of Arachnocampa are endemic to Australia and New Zealand, dwelling in caves and grottos, or sheltered places in forests.

A previous synonym was "Bolitiphila," meaning "mushroom lover," in the past.  The name was changed in 1924 to Arachnocampa, meaning "spider web-worm," for the way the larvae hang sticky silk threads to ensnare prey. The genus Arachnocampa belongs in the family Keroplatidae.

Common features 

Arachnocampa species have holometabolous metamorphosis with eggs, larvae, pupae, and adults.  Individuals spend most of their lives as larvae.

These flies live from about 6 through 12 months as larvae, depending on food availability.  A larva is only about 3–5 mm long when it emerges from its egg, and can grow up to about 3 cm long.

The larva spins a nest out of silk on the ceiling of the cave and then hangs down as many as 70 threads of silk (called snares) from around the nest, each up to 30 or 40 cm long and holding droplets of mucus.  The larvae can only live in a place out of the wind, to stop their lines being tangled, hence caves, overhangs or deep rainforest. In some species, the droplets of mucus on the silk threads are poisonous, enhancing the trap's ability to subdue prey quickly.

A larva's glow attracts prey into its threads.  The roof of a cave covered with larva can look remarkably like a blue starry sky at night.  A hungry larva glows brighter than one that has just eaten.. Prey include midges, mayflies, caddisflies, mosquitos, moths, and even small snails or millipedes.  When a prey animal is caught by a snare, its larva pulls it up (at up to about 2 mm a second) and feeds on the prey. When Arachnocampa prey are scarce, larvae may show cannibalism, eating other larvae, pupae or adult flies.

The glow is the result of a chemical reaction that involves luciferin, the substrate; luciferase, the enzyme that acts upon luciferin; adenosine triphosphate, the energy molecule; and oxygen.  It occurs in modified excretory organs known as Malpighian tubules in the abdomen.

The body of the larva is soft while the head capsule is hard.  When it outgrows the head capsule it moults, shedding its skin.  This happens four times throughout its life.

At the end of the larva stage, it becomes a pupa, hanging down from the roof of the cave.  The pupa stage lasts about 1 or 2 weeks and it glows intermittently.  The male stops glowing a few days before emerging, the female's glow increases.  The glow from the female is believed to be to attract a mate, and males may be waiting there when she emerges.

The adults of both sexes cannot feed and live only a short time.  They glow, but only intermittently.  Their sole purpose is to mate, and for the female to lay eggs.  Adult insects are poor fliers and so will often remain in the same area, building a colony of glowworms.  The female lays a total of about 130 eggs, in clumps of 40 or 50, and dies soon after laying.  The eggs hatch after about 20 days and the cycle repeats.

The larvae are sensitive to light and disturbance and will retreat into their nests and stop glowing if they or their snares are touched.  Generally they have few predators. Their greatest danger is from human interference.

Species
Arachnocampa buffaloensis Baker, 2010 is found in an alpine cave on Mount Buffalo in Victoria. Its presence suggests rainforest may have extended up the mountain in the past.  This species is listed as a threatened species in Victoria (listed as Arachnocampa sp. "Mount Buffalo glow-worm").
Arachnocampa flava Harrison, 1966 is found in Queensland.  The Natural Bridge in the Gold Coast hinterland is one well-known habitat.
Arachnocampa gippslandensis Baker, 2010 - eastern Victoria
Arachnocampa girraweenensis Baker, 2010 - southeast Queensland and northern New South Wales
Arachnocampa luminosa (Skuse, 1891) is found in New Zealand, in both the North and South islands.
Arachnocampa otwayensis Baker, 2010 - western Victoria
Arachnocampa richardsae Harrison, 1966 is found in New South Wales.  The Newnes glow worm tunnel in the Blue Mountains is one well-known habitat.
Arachnocampa tasmaniensis Ferguson, 1925 is found in Tasmania (as the name suggests). One habitat is the Marakoopa Cave, Mole Creek near Cradle Mountain.
Arachnocampa tropica Baker, 2010 - north Queensland

See also

 Orfelia fultoni - a North American relative that has similar habits.

References

Further reading
 The New Zealand Glowworm by V.B. Meyer-Rochow,  1990,  Published by Waitomo Caves Museum Society. 60 pages [The book can be obtained from: Waitomo Caves Museum, P.O.Box 12, Waitomo Caves, New Zealand]
 The Glow-Worm, Ormiston Walker and Judy Kerdel, MacMillan New Zealand, 1990, .  (A children's book.)
 Glowworm article, Encyclopædia Britannica, 15th edition
Broadley, R. A. (2012) Notes on pupal behaviour, eclosion, mate attraction, copulation and predation of the New Zealand glowworm Arachnocampa luminosa (Skuse) (Diptera: Keroplatidae), at Waitomo. New Zealand Entomologist 35(1): 1–9.
Broadley, R. A. and Stringer, I.A.N. (2009) Larval behaviour of the New Zealand glowworm, Arachnocampa luminosa (Diptera: Keroplatidae), in bush and caves. In: V.B. Meyer-Rochow (Ed.), Bioluminescence in Focus - A Collection of Illuminating Essays (pp. 325–355). Research Signpost. Kerala.
Baker, C. H., (2008) Distribution and phylogenetic relationships of Australian glow-worms Arachnocampa (Diptera, Keroplatidae) Molecular Phylogenetics and Evolution 48: 506-514
Baker, C. H. and Merritt, D.J. (2003) Life cycle of an Australian glow-worm Arachnocampa flava Harrison (Diptera: Keroplatidae: Arachnocampa). Australian Entomologist 30(2): 45-55
Baker, C. H., (2003) Australian glow-worms: Managing an important biological resource. Australasian Cave and Karst Management Association Inc. 53: 13 – 16
Baker, C. H. (2002) Dipteran glow-worms: Marvellous maggots weave magic for tourists. (ed Skevington J.H. and Dang, P.T.) Exploring the diversity of flies (Diptera). Biodiversity 3(4): 3-28
Baker, C. H., (2002) A biological basis for management of glow-worm populations of ecotourism significance. Wildlife Tourism Research report series: No 21, CRC for Sustainable Tourism, Gold Coast, QLD. 76 pp.
Broadley, R.A. and Stringer, I.A.N. (2001) Prey attraction by larvae of the New Zealand glowworm, Arachnocampa luminosa (Diptera: Mycetophilidae). Invertebrate Biology 120 (2): 170–177.

External links 
 Atlas of Living Australia: Arachnocampa
 Soil Bugs - An illustrated guide to the New Zealand invertebrates
 Glowworm article in the Encyclopaedia of New Zealand 1966 
 Glowworms page (Archived 2009-10-25)

Keroplatidae
Sciaroidea genera
Diptera of New Zealand
Insects of Australia
Bioluminescent insects
Cave insects